Floral Park Memorial High School is a coeducational, public high school in Floral Park, New York, United States. It is one of five schools in the Sewanhaka Central High School District. The high school enrolls students in grades 7 through 12.

As of the 2018–19 school year, the school had an enrollment of 1,389 students and 94.0 classroom teachers (on an FTE basis), for a student–teacher ratio of 14.8:1. There were 253 students (18.2% of enrollment) eligible for free lunch and 38 (2.7% of students) eligible for reduced-cost lunch.

Awards and recognition
During the 1994–96 school years, Floral Park Memorial High School was recognized with the Blue Ribbon School Award of Excellence by the United States Department of Education, the highest award an American school can receive. The school also received a U.S. News gold medal for being one of the best public high schools in the United States.

Athletics
The school has Colorguard and Marching Band, junior varsity and varsity boys' and girls' basketball, boys' baseball, boys' and girls' track, girls' softball, boys' and girls' volleyball, boys' and girls' soccer, boys' and girls' lacrosse, boys' football, girls' field hockey boys' riflery, girls' cheerleading, and kickline.

The Varsity Girls' Basketball Team are the 2006–2007 and 2007–2008 Nassau County Class "A" Champions. They are the Long Island Champions in 2007–2008 and in 2008–2009.

The Colorguard and Marching Band have won many awards, their most recent being 2nd place in all of New York State, at the New York state marching band festival, held in Syracuse

World record
In 2007, students at Floral Park Memorial High School broke the Guinness Book of World Records previous record for most hugs in one hour by a single person. The previous record was 640 hugs in one hour and the new record is now 844 people, with the record being broken in 22 minutes. The event was a fundraiser for a scholarship in the honor of two students who lost their lives at the end of the 2005–2006 school year.

References

External links

Booster Club Website

Public high schools in New York (state)
Memorial High School
Schools in Nassau County, New York
Public middle schools in New York (state)